Meshelsheh-ye Olya (also Romanized as Meshelsheh-ye ‘Olyā; also known as Mesheylshīyeh-ye ‘Olyā) is a village in Abdoliyeh-ye Gharbi Rural District, in the Central District of Ramshir County, Khuzestan Province, Iran. At the 2006 census, its population was 49, in 10 families.

References 

Populated places in Ramshir County